Kiyone may refer to:
Kiyone, Okayama
Kiyone Station
Kiyone, a Tenchi Muyo! character

See also
Kiyone Kotetsu,  a Soul Reaper in Bleach